Laicy Cecil "Cys" Kurland was a South African international footballer. He won seven caps for the South African national side in 1947. Kurland was Jewish.

References

Year of birth missing (living people)
Possibly living people
South African soccer players
South Africa international soccer players
Jewish footballers
South African Jews

Association footballers not categorized by position